Beau Michael Vincent Esparrago Belga (born November 30, 1986) is a Filipino professional basketball player for the Rain or Shine Elasto Painters of the Philippine Basketball Association. He is also an assistant coach for the UST Growling Tigers of the University Athletic Association of the Philippines (UAAP).

Early life

Belga was born and raised in Gubat, Sorsogon and is the eldest among the three siblings. His father was a family driver while his mother was a housewife. At a young age, he helped his grandmother sell balut, penoy, and other goods. He finished his high school education in Sorsogon. As a kid, he was very thin and was often bullied; as a way of escape, he focused his attention on basketball.

College career
He decided to go to Manila and study at Philippine Christian University. He was recruited to play for the PCU Dolphins by the school's swimming coach while he was playing billiards with his friends. While at PCU, he, along with future PBA stars Gabby Espinas and Jayson Castro, helped the team win its first ever NCAA title against host school University of Perpetual Help Altas in 2004.

Professional career
He was the seventh overall draft pick by Purefoods in 2008 before being traded to Burger King. He found his niche as a basketball player while playing for coach Yeng Guiao's Rain or Shine Elasto Painters, where he was known as one of the league's toughest players. While with Rain or Shine, he also became teammates with J.R. Quiñahan, and together they formed a duo in the low block, called the Extra Rice, Inc., owing to their weight and huge appetite.

PBA career statistics

As of the end of 2021 season

Season-by-season averages

|-
| align=left rowspan=2| 
| align=left | Purefoods
| rowspan=2|40 || rowspan=2|15.9 || rowspan=2|.537 || rowspan=2|.258 || rowspan=2|.535 || rowspan=2|4.0 || rowspan=2|.8 || rowspan=2|.5 || rowspan=2|.1 || rowspan=2|5.9
|-
| align=left | Burger King
|-
| align=left | 
| align=left | Burger King / Air21
| 38 || 22.8 || .426 || .231 || .702 || 6.3 || 1.2 || .6 || .6 || 7.9
|-
| align=left rowspan=2| 
| align=left | Meralco
| rowspan=2|41 || rowspan=2|20.1 || rowspan=2|.460 || rowspan=2|.290 || rowspan=2|.680 || rowspan=2|5.1 || rowspan=2|1.3 || rowspan=2|.3 || rowspan=2|.3 ||rowspan=2| 6.7
|-
| align=left | Rain or Shine
|-
| align=left | 
| align=left | Rain or Shine
| 53 || 22.0 || .423 || .247 || .648 || 5.1 || 1.3 || .6 || .5 || 6.8
|-
| align=left | 
| align=left | Rain or Shine
| 57 || 22.3 || .361 || .247 || .619 || 5.9 || 1.7 || .6 || .3 || 6.8
|-
| align=left | 
| align=left | Rain or Shine
| 59 || 22.4 || .439 || .295 || .627 || 5.1 || 1.6 || .6 || .5 || 8.6
|-
| align=left | 
| align=left | Rain or Shine
| 53 || 19.9 || .378 || .231 || .597 || 4.5 || 2.3 || .6 || .4 || 6.9
|-
| align=left | 
| align=left | Rain or Shine
| 54 || 20.4 || .445 || .289 || .664 || 5.2 || 1.8 || .5 || .4 || 8.1
|-
| align=left | 
| align=left | Rain or Shine
| 38 || 21.9 || .404 || .333 || .657 || 5.8 || 2.0 || .4 || .3 || 8.5
|-
| align=left | 
| align=left | Rain or Shine
| 37 || 22.1 || .390 || .321 || .695 || 5.4 || 2.5 || .5 || .3 || 8.7
|-
| align=left | 
| align=left | Rain or Shine
| 48 || 24.8 || .396 || .249 || .627 || 5.3 || 3.0 || .6 || .4 || 8.2
|-
| align=left | 
| align=left | Rain or Shine
| 12 || 26.1 || .432 || .319 || .737 || 5.8 || 2.0 || .6 || .7 || 10.9
|-
| align=left | 
| align=left | Rain or Shine
| 23 || 24.6 || .385 || .280 || .611 || 5.7 || 3.2 || .6 || .3 || 9.9
|-
| align=left | 
| align=left | Rain or Shine
| 33 || 22.0 || .401 || .272 || .714 || 5.1 || 3.1 || .4 || .2 || 8.0
|-class=sortbottom
| align=center colspan=2 | Career
| 586 || 21.7 || .415 || .274 || .643 || 5.2 || 1.9 || .5 || .4 || 7.7

National team career

In 2013, Belga was added to the Gilas Pilipinas training pool that competed in the 2013 FIBA Asia Championship, and was considered the "13th man", since he was the last man cut from the 12-man national team roster.  In 2014, he was included in the Gilas roster that played for the 2014 FIBA Asia Cup in Wuhan, China, 2014 FIBA World Cup in Spain, and 2014 Asian Games in Incheon, South Korea. In 2018, he will represent the Rain or Shine-backed Gilas Pilipinas in the 2018 Asian Games in Jakarta, Indonesia.

References

1986 births
Living people
Barako Bull Energy players
Basketball players from Sorsogon
Centers (basketball)
Magnolia Hotshots players
Meralco Bolts players
PCU Dolphins basketball players
Philippine Basketball Association All-Stars
Philippines men's national basketball team players
Filipino men's basketball players
People from Sorsogon
Power forwards (basketball)
Rain or Shine Elasto Painters players
Southeast Asian Games gold medalists for the Philippines
Southeast Asian Games competitors for the Philippines
Southeast Asian Games medalists in basketball
Basketball players at the 2018 Asian Games
Competitors at the 2007 Southeast Asian Games
Asian Games competitors for the Philippines
Filipino men's basketball coaches
Magnolia Hotshots draft picks
UST Growling Tigers basketball coaches